Nela Ticket ( Low Class Ticket) is a 2018 Indian Telugu-language action comedy film, produced by Ram Talluri on his production banner SRT Entertainments and directed by Kalyan Krishna Kurasala. It features Ravi Teja, Malvika Sharma, Jagapathi Babu in  the lead roles and music composed by Shakti Kanth Karthick. The film released worldwide on 25 May 2018.

Plot

Nela Ticket (Ravi Teja) is an orphan raised in an orphanage in Bangalore belonging to Ananda Bhupathi (Sarath Babu). Ananda gets killed by his own son Aditya Bhupathi (Jagapathi Babu), who later becomes the Home Minister. Nela Ticket runs into a tussle with Aditya's men, and this brings both Aditya and Nela Ticket opposite each other. The fight that happens between them and how Nela Ticket brings Aditya to justice forms the plot.

Cast

Production

Development 
In August 2016 US based NRI, Ram Talluri signed Ravi Teja for his next film. After much delay, in December 2017 director Kalyan Krishna Kurasala joined the project and Mumbai based model Malvika Sharma was signed in as a female lead, which marks her debut in cinema.

Jagapathi Babu was also signed to play the main antagonist and Shakthi Kanth Karthick joined as a music composer.

Filming 
Principal photography began on 5 January 2018 in Hyderabad. The shoot was wrapped up in early May 2018.

Release 
The film was theatrically released on 25 May 2018. The film was also dubbed and released in Hindi on YouTube by Goldmines Telefilms on 18 May 2019. The Hindi dubbed version crossed more than 180 million views on YouTube.

Soundtrack

The music is composed by Shakthi Kanth Karthick, and was released by Lahari Music Company, who held the audio launch on 10 May 2018 with Pawan Kalyan.

Reception
In its review of the film, The Times of India gave a rating of 1.5/5 and wrote “Mindless action scenes, love at first sight (quite literally), a dozen comedians who fail to evoke laughter, an evil politician and an aloof, goofy young man who suddenly turns into a saviour. Sounds familiar? Ravi Teja’s latest venture Nela Ticket is as predictable as they come. Loud and boorish, this Kalyan Krishna directorial lacks imagination and creativity.”

The Hindustan Times gave a rating of 1.5/5 and wrote “Nela Ticket scores low on sensitivity though with its rape jokes and the lead’s stalker-like behavior. Was it necessary to have a character threaten rape to get his way? Isn’t it time for Tollywood to lose this trope to get audiences to laugh, because it is tone-deaf and insensitive. And really, what is funny about it?”.

123telugu gave a rating of 2.25/5 and wrote "The film completely falters at the script level itself. Though the key points are joined well at the end, the way they are brought into the plot look logicless. Too many loopholes are clearly visible in the proceedings right throughout the film. Yet another drawback of the film is that it is painfully long. There was no need to stretch the plot to such extent in both the halves. After a point in time in the first half, you get so irritated to see the first half never coming to an end. The selection of heroine is pathetic as there is absolutely no chemistry between the lead pair and they don’t look good as a pair".

SMTV 24X7 gave a positive review, praising the story, direction and performances. They commented: " ... The director has made the film an entertaining watch by including the regular masala elements of Ravi Teja's movies. Its comedy and an emotional quotient will strike a chord with the audience. ... As usual, Ravi Teja has delivered a brilliant performance."

Legacy 
The film Namaste Nestama (2020) was named after a song in the film.

References

External links 
 

2010s Telugu-language films
2018 action drama films
Indian action drama films
Films shot in Hyderabad, India
Films shot in Andhra Pradesh
Films shot in Visakhapatnam
Films shot in Vijayawada
Films directed by Kalyan Krishna